Lev Stepanovich Gurilyov (1770–1844) was a renowned Russian serf musician and composer of church music and liturgical works in the Italian style fashionable at the period. Father of pianist and composer Aleksander Gurilyov, he was a violin player and kapellmeister in the orchestra of Count Vladimir Grigorievich Orlov. He was a pupil of Giuseppe Sarti, he also studied music under the guidance of Irish composer John Field.

Musical works
Emancipated after the death of his owner in 1831, Lev Gurilyov composed many piano pieces and variations on Russian folk themes.
Sonata (1794)
24 Preludes (1810)
Prelude in G Minor
Na Bozhestvenney Strazhe (On Divine Watch, a double-choir concerto)

References

External links

Russian pianists
Russian male classical composers
Russian Romantic composers
1770 births
1844 deaths
19th-century classical composers
Male pianists
19th-century male musicians